Consumer Rights Commission of Pakistan, (CRCP) is a rights-based civil initiative registered under the Trust Act, 1882. Established in 1998, CRCP is an independent, non-profit, and non-governmental organization. It largely works through local fund-raising and engaging volunteers. It is not supported by any industry or commercial sector. It is the first national consumer organization in the country, which approaches the issue of consumer protection in comprehensive and holistic terms. Its vision and strategies have significant cross linkages with both market practices and issues of governance.

External links
 Consumer Rights Commission of Pakistan webpage
 Consumer Rights Commission of Pakistan on Facebook

Non-profit organisations based in Pakistan
Consumer rights organizations
Organizations established in 1998